A peg is a unit of volume, typically used to measure amounts of liquor in the Indian subcontinent. Informally, a peg is an undefined measure of any alcoholic drink poured in a glass.

The terms "large (badda) peg" and "small (chota) peg" are equal to 60ml and 30ml, respectively, with "peg" alone simply referring to a 60ml peg. The "chota peg" was often used by the 1940s mythical British Indian Army figure "Colonel Chinstrap" in the UK Radio Serial "ITMA" ("It's That Man Again") who was frequently having Chota Pegs of whisky (and sounded like it in his deliberately slurred speech).

In India, liquor's alcohol content is typically 42.8% ABV. A 30 ml of liquor usually contains 12.84ml of pure alcohol,

See also
 Gorkhali Peg
 Patiala peg

References

Bartending equipment
Cooking weights and measures
Units of measurement
Units of volume